Nokia 6125 is a Nokia "Clamshell" phone. The phone was launched in the first quarter of 2006. It has been discontinued.

References

6125
Mobile phones with infrared transmitter